Dudu is a village and municipality in Udhampur district of the Indian union territory of Jammu and Kashmir. The town is located 100 kilometres from the district headquarters Udhampur.

Demographics
According to the 2011 census of India, Dudu village has 312 households. The literacy rate of Dudu village was 47.29% compared to 67.16% of Jammu and Kashmir. In Duggan, Male literacy stands at 62.87% while the female literacy rate was 30.42%.

Transport

Road
Dudu is well-connected by road to other places in Jammu and Kashmir and India by Ramnagar Road and NH 44.

Rail
The nearest major railway stations to Dudu are Jammu Tawi railway station and Udhampur railway station located at a distance of 161 kilometres and 100 kilometres respectively.

Air
The nearest airport to Gundna is Jammu Airport located at a distance of 160 kilometres and is a 5-hour drive.

See also
Jammu and Kashmir
Udhampur district
Udhampur

References

Villages in Udhampur district